Giampietro Cicoria (born 15 July 1984) is a Swiss professional footballer who plays as a defender. His clubs include SC Cham, Emmenbrücke, FC Lucerne and FC Kickers Lucerne.

References

1984 births
Living people
Swiss men's footballers
SC Cham players
FC Luzern players
Association football defenders